Ungmennafélag Hrunamanna, commonly known as Hrunamenn or UMFH, is a multi-sport club in Flúðir, Iceland. It was founded in 1908.

Basketball

Men's basketball

History
In 2020, Hrunamenn where offered and accepted a vacant seat in the second-tier 1. deild karla. In July 2020, the team signed former EuroLeague player Jasmin Perković as a player/assistant coach.

Trophies and achievements
2. deild karla
 Winners: 2008, 20171
1 As Hrunamenn/Laugdælir

Coaching history
 Árni Þór Hilmarsson 200?–2011
 Árni Þór Hilmarsson 2014–present

Notable players
 Jasmin Perković

Volleyball

Men's Volleyball

Trophies and achievements
2. deild karla
 Winners: 2013

References

External links
 Hrunamenn profile at Icelandic Basketball Association
 Hrunamenn profile at Football Association of Iceland

Basketball teams in Iceland
Football clubs in Iceland